KWNK-LP is a low power FM radio station broadcasting in Reno, Nevada, United States, at 97.7 MHz. KWNK is licensed to the Reno Bike Project and is a freeform community radio station serving the Reno area in partnership with the Holland Project and the University of Nevada Reno's online radio station, Wolf Pack Radio.

KWNK-LP began broadcasting on October 31, 2017, from 4 p.m. until 4 a.m, but now airs on a 24-hour schedule.

References

External links
 

WNK-LP
WNK-LP
Radio stations established in 2017
2017 establishments in Nevada
Community radio stations in the United States